Lucapina sowerbii, common name Sowerby's fleshy limpet, is a species of sea snail, a marine gastropod mollusk in the family Fissurellidae, the keyhole limpets.

Description
The size of the shell varies between 15 mm and 30 mm.

Distribution
This species occurs in the Atlantic Ocean from Florida to Brazil; in the Caribbean Sea, the Gulf of Mexico and the Lesser Antilles.

References

 Turgeon, D.D., et al. 1998. Common and scientific names of aquatic invertebrates of the United States and Canada. American Fisheries Society Special Publication 26 page(s): 58
 Rosenberg, G., F. Moretzsohn, and E. F. García. 2009. Gastropoda (Mollusca) of the Gulf of Mexico, pp. 579–699 in Felder, D.L. and D.K. Camp (eds.), Gulf of Mexico–Origins, Waters, and Biota. Biodiversity. Texas A&M Press, College Station, Texas.

External links
 

Fissurellidae
Gastropods described in 1835